Leslie Peter Johnson (3 July 1930 – 16 December 2016), also known as Peter Johnson, L. Peter Johnson, or L. P. Johnson, was a British Germanist, who specialized in the literature of the Middle High German "golden age". He was Reader in  Medieval German Literature at the University of Cambridge and a fellow of Pembroke College.

Biography
Leslie Peter Johnson was born in Newcastle upon Tyne, England on 3 July 1930.
He was awarded a BA in French and German from King's College, Durham (now the University of Newcastle Upon Tyne) in 1951, and his Dr.Phil. from the University of Kiel in 1955, with a thesis on Wolfram von Eschenbach under Wolfgang Mohr.

After a brief period as a Lektor in Frankfurt, Peter Johnson returned from Germany to take up a lectureship at Cardiff University, before moving to Cambridge in 1959 for an Assistant Lectureship in the Department of German in the Faculty of Modern and Medieval Languages. Becoming a member of Pembroke College in the same year, he was elected to the college's fellowship in 1961. In 1963 he was promoted to Lecturer and in 1994 to Reader, a post which he held until his retirement in 1997, when he was granted the title of Emeritus Reader. In the faculty he held the post of Head of Department of Other Languages for ten years.

In the wider world of German Studies, he played a central role in the Conference of University Teachers of German in Britain and Ireland, and was for many years the co-chair of the Wolfram von Eschenbach Gesellschaft, the leading association for medieval German scholarship. His interest in and support for younger linguists was reflected in school visits and A-level examining.

Johnson specialized in German philology, particularly the study of Middle High German literature. Johnson wrote the chapter on the German language for Malcolm Pasley's German: A Companion to German Studies (1972), for which he received high praise. Johnson's magnum opus, Die Höfische Literatur der Blütezeit: (1160/70-1220/30) (1999), is considered the authoritative work on that subject. A festschrift in Johnson's honor, Blütezeit (2000), was published by Max Niemeyer Verlag in 2000, and reprinted by Walter de Gruyter in 2012.

Peter Johnson was married and had one daughter. He died on 16 December 2016.

Selected works

Festschriften

See also
 Dennis Howard Green

Citations

Sources

External links
 Leslie Peter Johnson at the Deutsche Digitale Bibliothek
 Leslie Peter Johnson at Regesta Imperii (Note: some of the items listed are in fact by the Middle English scholar Lesley Johnson.)

1930 births
2016 deaths
Academics of the University of Cambridge
English male non-fiction writers
British medievalists
English philologists
Fellows of Pembroke College, Cambridge
Germanic studies scholars
Germanists
People from Newcastle upon Tyne
University of Kiel alumni
Alumni of King's College, Newcastle